German Fest is an ethnic festival in Milwaukee, Wisconsin, at the Henry Maier Festival Park, on the Lake Michigan lakefront. The genesis of German Fest occurred when Mayor Henry Maier challenged the local German-American community during a speech on May 20, 1980, at the 20th anniversary of the German American National Congress (DANK) to organize a German festival.   Shortly thereafter, Walter Geissler, then President of D.A.N.K., chaired a committee of five members that laid the foundation for the Fest. The charter of German Fest was subsequently written in January 1981. The first German Fest was held in August 1981. It is billed as the "Largest German celebration in North America" and "A Milwaukee Tradition". It currently occurs during the last full weekend in July.  As of 1993, Milwaukee had a 52% German population, which is the largest European percentage in a major U.S. metropolitan area.

German Fest celebrates the culture, food, travel, and history of Germany,  as well as Switzerland, Austria, Liechtenstein, South Tyrol, and German-speaking communities around the world. Along with traditional music, many from the Europe also make the journey to perform and educate at the festival.

One attraction is the cultural tent, where one can see the various groups, including both former and current provinces that proudly call themselves "German."  They range from Bavarians (Bayern), and Hessians (Hessen), to other German speaking nations like the Austrians (Österreich), and groups displaced by World War II whose homelands are now located in Poland (Polen), Hungary (Ungarn), and the former Czechoslovakia and Yugoslavia (Tschechoslowakei & Jugoslawien).

In the center area of the grounds a parade periodically passes by, showcasing 38 German-American heritage organizations, local German immersion schools, and others celebrating their German heritage.

German cuisine is also featured at German Fest.  Many well-known German restaurants and food services in the area are present at the fest, including Mader's, and the Schwabenhof, as well as the biggest sausage maker in Milwaukee, Usinger's.  Usinger's celebrated its 125th anniversary in 2005, in a joint anniversary of German Fest's 25th anniversary.

The 40th was to have taken place in 2020; however, the COVID-19 pandemic caused officials to defer it to 2021.

References

External links
 German Fest website
 30 Years of Milwaukee’s Original Haus Party

Festivals in Milwaukee
German-American culture in Milwaukee
Henry Maier Festival Park